Leverock is a surname. Notable people with the surname include:

Dante Leverock (born 1992), Bermudian footballer
Dwayne Leverock (born 1971), Bermudian cricketer
Kamau Leverock (born 1994), Bermudian cricketer, nephew of Dwayne